The Wilde Leck is a mountain, in the Stubai Alps in the Austrian state of Tyrol. It rises immediately west of the Sulztalferner glacier and towers above the Ötztal valley, 5.5 km northwest of Sölden.
It has a rocky summit made of solid granite and prominent arêtes. In the Stubai Alps the Wilde Leck is one of the most difficult summits to climb, because its easiest route runs initially over glaciers and then up a rock face that is assessed as climbing grade III (UIAA).

Just north of the Wilde Leck ("Wild Leck") is the Zahme Leck ("Tame Leck").

Ascents 
 South Face (grade II - III)
 East Arête III - in one place IV

Literature 
Heinrich and Walter Klier, Alpine Club Guide Stubaier Alpen, Bergverlag Rudolf Rother, Munich, 1988.

Sources 
 Hochstubai Hut
 DAV Dresden Branch

References 

Alpine three-thousanders
Mountains of the Alps
Mountains of Tyrol (state)
Stubai Alps